Jana Bittó Cigániková (née Jana Cigániková, born 15 September 1983 in Bratislava) is a Slovak politician, serving as an MP of the National Council since 2016. She is a member of the Freedom and Solidarity party.

Early life 
Cigániková studied Public Administration at the School of Economics and Management in Public Administration in Bratislava and Healthcare Management at the Central European Management Institute in Prague, graduating in 2018.

Before entering politics, she worked in sales. In 2009 she established a network of private kindergartens called HAPPY.

Political career 
She joined the Freedom and Solidarity party in 2012. In 2013, she was elected to the regional assembly of the Bratislava Region. In 2016 Slovak parliamentary election, she gained an MP seat in the National Council. She retained her seat in the 2020 Slovak parliamentary election.  As an MP, she focuses on Healthcare and Abortion rights.

In late September 2022, she filled charges against fellow MP, Romana Tabak, accusing her of assault in a nightclub.

Personal life 
In 2020 she married former reality show contestant Daniel Bittó. She has two sons from her previous marriage.

References

Living people
1983 births
Politicians from Bratislava
Freedom and Solidarity politicians
Members of the National Council (Slovakia) 2016-2020
Members of the National Council (Slovakia) 2020-present
Female members of the National Council (Slovakia)
21st-century Slovak politicians